The 1932 North Carolina Tar Heels football team represented the University of North Carolina at Chapel Hill during the 1932 college football season. The Tar Heels were led by seventh-year head coach Chuck Collins and played their home games at Kenan Memorial Stadium. They competed as a member of the Southern Conference.

Schedule

References

North Carolina
North Carolina Tar Heels football seasons
North Carolina Tar Heels football